Optical Allusions is a graphic novel created by Assistant Professor of Biology at Juniata College, Jay Hosler. Published in 2008, it is the first graphic novel ever funded by the National Science Foundation.

Plot
Wrinkles the Wonder Brain has lost his bosses' eye and now he has to search all of human imagination for it.  Along the way, he confronts biology head on and accidentally learns more about eyes and the evolution of vision than he thought possible.

External links
 Official Optical Allusions website
 Jay Hosler's website

American graphic novels